A synonym is a word with an identical or very similar meaning to another word.

Synonym may also refer to:

 Synonym (taxonomy), a different scientific name used for a single taxon
 Synonym (database), an alias or alternate name for a table, view, sequence, or other schema objects in a database
 Synonyms (film), a 2019 film

Synonymous may refer to:

 Synonymous substitution, an evolutionary substitution in a DNA sequence coding for a protein, such that the coded amino acid remains unmodified.